A Protestant/Evangelical Youth Ministry is a Christian Ministry intended to instruct and disciple youths in what it means to be a Christian, how to mature as a Christian, and how to encourage others to claim Jesus as their Saviour through Evangelism and apologetics. This is accomplished through teaching, relationship building and/or mentoring. Youth ministries may vary widely depending on their denomination, size, liberal or conservative outlook and geographic location. The ministries themselves are almost always built on relationships between the youth minister and the student and their shared perception of their relationship to God. Youth have become an integral part of nearly every church’s ministry programming, and youth ministries continue to have a profound impact on the societies in which they exist.

The doctrine of Sunday Sabbatarianism held by many Christian denominations encourages practices such as Sunday School attendance as it teaches that the entirety of the Lord's Day should be devoted to God; as such many children and teenagers often return to church in the late afternoon for youth group before attending an evening service of worship.

History of Youth Ministry
While youth organizations exist worldwide, the history section of this article will put a special focus on the development of youth ministry in America.

The beginnings of Youth Ministry were in the mid-19th century, in the wake of the industrial revolution. Churches took note of all the young men who moved into central urban areas to work in factories. Laypersons who noticed these young adults working six days a week and gallivanting about town on Sundays aspired to educate them. Thus early Youth Ministry began when churches brought older children and teenagers into classrooms to teach them how to read the Bible. Early Ministry was designed for unchurched children with no formal education; while the primary goal of early Youth Ministry was education, a desirable secondary effect was that students would realize through Biblical passages that they are sinners in need of forgiveness. 

Eventually, churches opened up Sunday school to church members and unchurched children and teens alike. Teachers encouraged the students to bring their friends along, and the movement gained momentum. Laypersons would often work independently, neither subjecting themselves to congregational scrutiny nor receiving church funding. This fostered the development of interdenominational teaching programs and, eventually, faith-based organizations devoted to youth such as the YMCA and YWCA, whose American branches were founded in the 1850's.

The most recognizable effort to offer periodic Bible studies, social networking and outreach opportunities for youth was spearheaded by Francis Edward Clark. He began the Christian Endeavor Society in 1881. Clark wanted to change the view of young people in churches from “pitchers waiting to be filled” to young adults “responsible for larger service in the church of Christ.” The Christian Endeavor Society revolutionized youth ministry and became extremely popular in its first years of operation. Clark set the limit for each society at 80 members. By 1887, there were 700 societies with over 50,000 members spread out across 33 states.

One common speculation is that churches in the 1880s became fearful that they would lose all of their young members to these societies. In response, mainstream denominations began their own youth organizations modelled after the Christian Endeavor Society. Some examples are the Methodist church’s Epworth League, or the Lutheran’s Luther League. These new church-based organizations, as well as interdenominational ones already in existence, flourished, increasing in attendance and international outreach involvement as a part of faith-based foreign aid.

After World War I, the focus of many youth ministries began to shift from outreach and conversion to education and understanding of faith. It was during this time that teenagers began to think theologically as well as gain a social awareness of the world around them. From the 1930's to the 1960's, the churches emphasized fellowship and theological understanding.

Before 1940, it was the pastor’s job to do everything in the church, including youth fellowships. During the late 1940's there was some introduction of church youth committees - youth were returning from the war with great life-experience and they could not be kept out of leadership in the church just because they were in their twenties.

The 1940's was also the beginning of Parachurch Ministries. Young Life was founded by Jim Rayburn in 1941. The Young Life Parachurch Model proved to be effective at reaching young people for Christ, and by the early 1950's, Parachurch Youth Ministries with full-time staff flourished. Billy Graham was the first full-time parachurch worker for Youth for Christ (YfC) in the USA. This movement spread quickly around the world. During the 1950's, Parachurch Ministries grew rapidly in most Christianized countries, and the focus of activity was on large events, known as rallies, and stadium events, known as Crusades. The emphasis was on promoting inter-church activities (between local denominational churches) – mainly in the format of youth rallies – the type of stadium events made popular by YfC.

The 1960's were characterized by campus ministries. Many college-aged students did not have their theological needs met by these fellowship groups; soon thereafter, even younger adolescents began to see their organizations as institutionalized and irrelevant. Denominations stopped publishing youth group (Sunday School) resources and large group gatherings dwindled down into small meetings and then into nothing. Then specific church-based activities for youth emerged, as Friday night youth groups began.

During the 1970's, many denominations implemented strategies for modernizing existing Youth Ministry in the hopes of reviving it. This is the point where differences in Youth Ministry started to emerge on a denominational basis instead of organization to organization. Youth ministries operate in different ways today, but most of them have the same set of goals, which will be discussed in the Goals of Youth Ministry subsection of this article.

During the early 1980's, the counselling revolution hit the church with its emphasis on honesty and openness. Professional counsellors began to be employed in churches. This influenced youth groups and the Bible study meetings became "fellowship groups" or "home groups" with an emphasis on caring and meeting people. It was also during the 1980's that a large number of local church youth pastors began expressing the desire to stay in Youth Ministry as a lifelong career.

The 1990's saw the start an emerging church movement, and many of the youth leaders from the 1970's and 1980's were pioneers in this approach. During the 1990's there was also a move to create international interaction between different youth structures. Pioneers in this approach are the International Association for the Study of Youth Ministry (IASYM).

More recently, despite Francis Edward Clark's original intent for youth ministry to raise young adults “responsible for larger service in the Church of Christ,” studies indicate significant numbers of young people are not transitioning into the Adult Church from Youth Ministry after graduation from high school. As a result, more churches are scrutinizing their traditional Youth Ministry programming and working to engage parents and the Adult Church more fully with the young people and involve young people more deeply in the work of the church.

Youth Ministry Institute
Many faithful organizations like the Princeton Theological Seminary Institute for Youth Ministry, Youth Ministry Institute at Fuller Theological Seminary, Schaeffer Institute of Church leadership and Into Thy Word ministries have been wholeheartedly committed to and involved in Youth Ministry research for over for 30 years.

In 1978, Francis Schaeffer said: Youth Ministry is perhaps the most important Ministry of The Church and it is essential that we are willing and committed to reach students for the Christian faith before they enter College. Richard Krejcir, an avid researcher and Youth Pastor states, “After a student leaves the safe and fun youth culture of a caring church, even a great one, there is a 70%+ chance they will never come back to any church? Why is that? There are a multitude of reasons, but from our research and experience during over 30 years of doing Youth Ministry, we have found the number one reason to be that most churches and Youth Pastors spend very little time in mentoring and teaching their youth.” The Schaeffer Institute states, “Many youth are not being taught to read and study the Bible or how to pray or understand Christian basics, and thus they tend not to develop a firm foundation of faith. So, when they are occupied in college life and in the world, they get clobbered and lose what little faith they have built up!”

Composition of Youth Ministry in America
Youth ministry today is a large part of American Christian culture. In New York City alone there are over 3,500 youth organizations operating today. Despite denominational difference, there are basic practices and goals that most youth groups have in common.

Basics of Youth Ministry
Most youth groups tend to follow a similar organizational model. The church that supports them will provide an allocation of funds to use for the activities of the group. It also will employ a paid staff member or volunteer to lead the group, known as the Youth Pastor, Youth Minister, Pastor of Student Ministries, Youth Leader, or other similar terms. This person can be either a layperson, hold a religious degree, or be a member of the ordained clergy, depending on the needs and resources of the church. Their duties may include orchestrating the activities of the group (in particular, the content of the regular meetings below), providing pastoral care for the members of the youth group, managing a budget for the youth group, and serving as a liaison between the youth and adult bodies of the congregation.

Today's youth ministries hold regular meetings, often at the same time as adult functions at the church. Youth group meetings generally feature the same types of activities as a Sunday morning church service; modified to reflect the culture of the age groups involved. Services may include a time for worship, drama, games or other activities as well as fellowship through conversation and/or food, and prayer. Many youth ministers also present a sermon or devotional. It's common for youth groups to attend Christian summer camps each year.

Most denominations arrange their Youth Ministry programs according to related educational levels. American churches tend to separate youth by grade level, creating smaller sub-groups within a youth ministry program. These distinctions usually fall between middle school and high school. Traditionally, elementary age children and below have separate programs altogether, though this, too, may be managed by the same youth pastor. Some youth groups even extend up through college students, creating an additional sub-group often referred to as "college and career".

Goals of Youth Ministry
The primary goal of most modern-day Youth Ministries is to teach youth the Biblical Doctrines of Christ and salvation, as well as to encourage them to regularly pray. This is different from the original education/literacy-centered programs of Sunday schools during the 19th century. Churches provide money for youth groups in order for their purposes to be furthered, and the stated purpose of many churches is to share the content of the Bible with the world. This is why the structure of many youth ministry services are centered around a sermon, the Biblical teaching presented at these meetings.

Before the turn of the 21st century, many denominations placed less emphasis on the role of youth in the church. It is more important now than ever before that young people should “serve in church-wide responsibilities.” Churches now encourage teenagers to evangelize at their age, rather than waiting until adulthood to spread the Gospel.

In addition, many sermons are delivered with the intent for youth to come to know Christ personally - if they have not done so already. Once they do, emphasis is often placed on spiritual growth. Many youth groups, like the churches they may be associated with, vie to embark on mission trips. These acts of faith-based foreign aid often involve service projects alongside sharing the Gospel.

Youth groups often teach topics related to Christian apologetics, drawing from books by Christian thinkers such as John Lennox, C.S. Lewis, John Polkinghorne, Francis Collins and William Lane Craig.

See also

 Community youth development
 Community organization
 Parachurch organization
 Sunday School
 Youth activism
 Youth culture
 Youth development
 Youth empowerment
 Youth organizations
 Youth rights

References

Further reading
 International Association for the Study of Youth Ministry
 Goreham, A. 2004. "Denominational Comparison of Rural Youth Ministry Programs" Review of Religious Research. 45, (4). 336-348.
 Richter, D. 2004. "Youth ministry in modern America: 1930 to the present" Journal of Family Ministry. 18, (2). 106-107.
 Smith, C. 2002. "Mapping American Adolescent Religious Participation" Journal for the Scientific Study of Religion. 41, (4). 597-612.

External links

Evangelical parachurch organizations
Christian youth organizations
Protestant education
Youth organizations based in the United States